John Gregory ( Gregori, 12 October 1924 – 23 April 2020) was a British bandleader who also recorded as Nino Rico and as Chaquito.

Life and career
Born in London on 12 October 1924, he was one of five children of Maria (née Rossi) and Frank Gregori, who was the leader of a dance band that played at the Italian restaurant Quaglino's. Encouraged by his parents, who realised he was exceptionally musical, John studied the violin with the virtuoso teacher Alfredo Campoli and went on to take lessons in counterpoint and harmony at the London College of Music. After a brief stint as a violinist with his father's band, by the late 1940s he was performing by himself and working as a staff arranger with Philips Records.  His first broadcast as an arranger, for the BBC Revue Orchestra, aired in 1944.   He was the BBC Radio Orchestra’s principal guest conductor for 17 years and continued to be recognised as one of the best and most innovative orchestral composers and arrangers of his time.  He also collaborated with vocalists including Cleo Laine and Nana Mouskouri.

In the late 1950s, he recorded Latin-flavoured albums as Nino Rico, and then as Chaquito.  In 1960, he began to make his own records, with The Cascading Strings, as part of the Philips record label’s easy listening albums. More unusual was Melodies of Japan (1963), a reworking of the traditional folk music of the far east.

He scored several films and TV shows, including Serena (1962), Impact (1963), The Night Caller (1965) and Don't Drink the Water (1974).  In the mid-1970s, he regularly recorded under his own name, producing albums such as A Man for All Seasons and The Detectives. He won an Ivor Novello Award in 1976 for "Introduction and Air to a Stained Glass Window". From 1974 to 1991 he was the conductor of the BBC Radio Orchestra.   He composed his last film score in 2002.

Gregory died on 23 April 2020, at the age of 95.

References

External links

1924 births
2020 deaths
20th-century composers
British bandleaders
British male conductors (music)
Easy listening musicians
English film score composers
English male film score composers
English music arrangers
English television composers
Ivor Novello Award winners
Musicians from London